Malva Bluff is a steep, south-facing rock bluff at the base of Condor Peninsula, overlooking the northwestern extremity of Hilton Inlet on the east side of Palmer Land, Antarctica. It was mapped by the United States Geological Survey (USGS) in 1974, and was named by the Advisory Committee on Antarctic Names after Antonio I. Malva-Gomes, a topographic engineer with the USGS Lassiter Coast geologic and mapping party in 1970–71.

References

Cliffs of Palmer Land